Dudani is a surname.  Notable persons with this name include:

 Bobby Dudani (1968–2015), British-Indian businessman
 Hritu Dudani, actress who appeared on the Indian soap opera Bandini
 Niranjan Dudani (1926–2020), Indian Navy flight surgeon, author, and American medical doctor.